An agriculture ministry (also called an) agriculture department, agriculture board, agriculture council, or agriculture agency, or ministry of rural development) is a ministry charged with agriculture. The ministry is often headed by a minister for agriculture.

Specific duties may relate to regulation, promotion, agricultural research, price supports and agricultural subsidies, plant diseases, invasive species and the management of biosecurity. Some countries have multiple agriculture ministries, devoting entire ministries to more specific policy areas such as forestry and fisheries; rural affairs; food and food quality, security, and safety; consumer protection; and matters relating to the environment.

Agriculture ministries by country

Former countries

See also
 GLOBALG.A.P
 Food administration
 Food and Agriculture Organization
 List of environmental ministries
 List of forestry ministries

References

External links 
 Mexican Secretariat of Agriculture website
 Russian Ministry of Agriculture website
 U.S. Department of Agriculture website

 
Ministries
Agriculture
Agriculture